tvN Show (stylized as tvN SHOW) is a South Korean TV channel, owned by CJ ENM E&M Division.

The channel, then known as XtvN, was originally scheduled to launch on January 19, 2018, replacing XTM due to the latter's low ratings. Due to delays, the launch took place on January 26, 2018. The channel was relaunched with its current name on September 1, 2021, together with sister channel tvN Drama (formerly O tvN).

The channel features shows that focus strongly on millennials, specifically targeting viewers between the ages 15 to 39.

Programs

TV series

Entertainment

References

External links 
 

CJ E&M channels
Television channels in South Korea
Korean-language television stations
Television channels and stations established in 2018
2018 establishments in South Korea
Men's interest channels